Kasey Lansdale is an American country music singer-songwriter
from Nacogdoches, Texas.  Lansdale is also known for her work as an author, editor, actress, and
producer, as well as host and founder of the East Texas Songwriter's Workshop. Her full-length debut album titled Restless was released on August 20, 2013 on Blue Siren Records co-produced Mike Clute and Kasey Lansdale. The Executive Producer is John Carter Cash.

Early life

Kasey Lansdale is a graduate of Nacogdoches High School. She attended Stephen F. Austin State University as a social work major, but did not complete her studies, dropping out to pursue her
musical and acting career.

Music career

In 2007, Lansdale debuted a three track EP with Texas Swing Song, Back of My Smile, penned
by Lansdale, catching the attention of venues throughout Texas. This led her to tour as an
opening act with her first band, "Kasey Lansdale & The Daletones," for country music legend,
Ray Price at several of his concerts throughout Texas.

She co-wrote two songs set to appear on the soundtrack of the horror film,
Christmas with the Dead.

Lansdale created and hosted "The East Texas Songwriter's Workshop,"
where Grammy Award winning artist Linda Davis, Grammy Nominee Songwriter Bonnie Baker,
and Grammy Award-winning producer John Carter Cash appeared as guests.

Kasey Lansdale penned the song Edge of Dark Water which was released as a digital download for British and American editions of the novel of the same name by her father Joe R. Lansdale.

Lansdale performed as a headliner at the Piacenza
Blues Festival, as well as other events and festivals across Europe. She recorded briefly
with Davide Di Leo or "Boosta," of the Premio Italiano della Musica award-winning group,
Subsonica.<ref>http://www.bmi.com/video/tag/C5340</ David Keith & Kasey Lansdale | Uniting for a good cause.</ref> Her 2010 album Never Say Never was recorded at Warner Nashville Studios.

On April 1, 2014 Kasey was recognized by the Country Music Association as Spotlight Star of the Month and toured with her producer John Carter Cash.

Lansdale's single, "Sorry Ain't Enough" debuted at #4 on the National MPE Downloads Chart. Her songs Back of My Smile and Foolin' Around were featured on the soundtrack for the film Cold in July.

In 2015 she was nominated for Best New Female Artist of the Year at the 2015 Texas Regional Radio Music Awards.
A new E.P. titled  Leave Her Wild is being released 08/01/16 on Blue Siren Records, Produced by John Carter Cash recorded at the Cash Cabin.

Lansdale’s EP Leave Her Wild, has been featured on Sundance Channel’s Hap and Leonard, a series based on her father's novels, as well as on The Animal Planet where she performed her single Living in the Moment Finding Bigfoot.

She opened for Wynonna Judd in 2016.

Writing career

Kasey Lansdale's short story "The Companion," on which she collaborated with her brother Keith and father Joe Lansdale, appeared in the Random House collection Great Writers and Kids Write Spooky Stories (Great Writers & Kids Anthologies) [Hardcover] ed. Greenberg, Morgan & Weinberg. This story later reappeared in A Fistfull of Stories, from Joe R. Lansdale, as well as the collection Bumper Crop.

Her non-fiction article "Growing up Lansdale style" was published in 2012 by online magazine The Horror Zine, and later published in The Horror Zine print anthology, "A Feast of Frights". She is also the editor of the horror anthology Impossible Monsters published by Subterranean Press and featuring stories from Neil Gaiman, Charlaine Harris, Anne Perry, Joe R. Lansdale, & David Schow among others.

Lansdale edited an all e-book horror fiction anthology wfor Biting Dog Press titled Fresh Blood & Old Bones showcasing new authors, published in September, 2012.

With her father she wrote the short story Blind Love included in the HarperCollins anthology Dark Duets.

Her short story, The Flame was published by SST publications in 2014.

In 2016, Subterranean Press published The Case of the Bleeding Wall: A Dana Roberts novella  co-written with her father Joe R. Lansdale. In May 2018  Terror is Our Business: Dana Roberts' Casebook of Horrors also co-written with her father, was published by Cutting Block Books. 
A “Creepshow” episode based on the short story "The Companion by Joe R. Lansdale, Kasey Lansdale, and Keith Lansdale, aired in 2019.

Pandi Press
Pandi Press is a publishing company formed by Kasey and her father Joe R. Lansdale to publish and re-issue Joe Lansdale's older works.

Film & theater career

Lansdale's first feature film role was Ella in the horror film, Christmas with the Dead.

In 2011, she produced a stage reading of "Suckerfish", written by W.T. Underwood and
directed by Thomas Jane, alongside the one act play, By Bizarre Hands, by Joe R. Lansdale, directed by Terrill Lee Lankford at the Steve Allen Theater in Los Angeles. She also appeared in Grammy award-winning artist Jim Lauderdale's music video "Ever Gonna Hurt" as the love interest. In 2015 Lansdale was featured in a short film by director Izzy Lee titled Postpartum.

Kasey Lansdale was a featured performer on the Sundance Channel TV show Hap and Leonard where she performed her original song Back Of My Smile. Season 2, ep 5.

Kasey narrated Stan Lee’s The Reflection voicing characters Margaret Fisher and Nina Fisher. She is also a voice actor in George RR Martin’s Wild Cards.

Personal life

Lansdale supports the non-profit organization, Protect: The National Association to Protect Children, as well as animal rights advocacy groups.
Lansdale has stated that Reba McEntire is her most important early musical influence. Her father is award-winning author Joe R. Lansdale.

Discography

No More Rain −2006 Blue Siren Records
Back of My Smile −2006 Blue Siren Records
Know Me −2007 Blue Siren Records
Never Say Never −2010 Blue Siren Records
Restless −2013 Blue Siren Records
MADD Texas Artists: Clouded Mind featured
Leave Her Wild EP. Single is Living in the Moment. Blue Siren Records, TBR 08/01/16.

Bibliography

Fresh Blood & Old Bones (2013) (Biting Dog Publications e-book, editor)
Impossible Monsters (2013) (Subterranean Press, editor)

References

External links
Official Website
Joe R. Lansdale Official Website
Pandi Press Official Website
Protect

American women country singers
American country singer-songwriters
Country musicians from Texas
Living people
People from Nacogdoches, Texas
Singer-songwriters from Texas
Stephen F. Austin State University alumni
Year of birth missing (living people)
21st-century American women